blkswn (pronounced black swan) is the debut studio album by American rapper Smino. It was released on March 14, 2017 with Zero Fatigue under license to Downtown Records.

The album includes guest appearances from Ravyn Lenae, Bari, Jay2, Via Rosa, Drea Smith, Akenya, Jean Deaux, and Noname, with production from Monte Booker, THEMpeople, Sango, Phoelix, and J. Bird. The artwork of the album was done by Victor Birriel and taken by Chicago native, Taylor Madison, photographer of Diary of Disposables.

Background 
The release date holds a special significance to the St. Louis rapper because 314 is the area code of his hometown.

Release and promotion

Singles 
On December 2, 2016, Smino announced the title of the album and released "blkswn" as the first single. On February 8, 2017, the second single, "Anita" was released. He released "Blkoscars" on February 24, and "Father Son, Holy Smoke" on March 10 as promotional singles. On July 26, the music video for "Netflix & Dusse" was released. On March 26, 2018, Smino released the album's final single and music video for "Wild Irish Roses".

Tours 
Following the album's release, he headlined in his month-long Swanita Tour, which included 22 dates with guests Monte Booker, Jay2, Bari, and Jean Deaux. Smino and Ravyn Lenae also opened for SZA on the CTRL Tour. During October, he was opening act for T-Pain on his Acoustic Tour, who later appeared on the remix for "Anita" on October 27.

Critical reception

Upon its release, album received critical acclaim and positive reviews. Kelsee Thomas of Earmilk said "Smino is letting us know in blkswn that he's aware of the change and of the fact that he needs to pay attention to keeping his vices under control now more than ever. He asked for this blessing and now he's asking for help while his blessings." Scott Glaysher of Exclaim said "Any time an artist can blend genres together in a way that doesn't seem forced or stolen, it definitely makes for an eye-opening listen." On March 17, 2017, Apple Music named Smino "New Artist of the Week".

Accolades

Track listing 

Notes
 "Amphetamine" contains a hidden track titled "Krash Kourse" featuring Bari, Jean Deaux, and Noname, produced by Monte Booker, Phoelix and J.Robb

Personnel 

 Smino – vocals
 Monte Booker – production
 Ravyn Lenae – vocals
 Bari – vocals
 theMIND – vocals
 Jay2 – vocals
 Via Rosa – vocals
 Drea Smith – vocals
 Akenya – vocals
 THEMpeople – production
 Sango – production
 Phoelix – production
 J. Bird – production
 J.Robb – production
 Noname – additional vocals
 Jean Deaux – additional vocals
 Julian Bell – additional background vocals, instrumentation
 Michael E. Neil – additional background vocals, instrumentation
 Erik Hunter – additional background vocals, instrumentation
 Victor Birriel – artwork
 Taylor Madison – artwork
 Elton "L10MixedIt" Chueng – engineering, mixing, mastering

References 

2017 debut albums
Smino albums